Haines and Bonner is a premium quality shirt manufacturer and retailer, founded in 1865, specialising in high quality fashionable shirts.

Its corporate heritage comes from the Snowdon Collar Works, which were established in Chard, Somerset, England in 1865. Chard was in the centre of the lace and sewing trades at that time with a plentiful supply of skilled labour. It first produced the stiff collars worn by gentlemen of the time. When fashions changed the factory became shirt makers for the same London clients.

Ken Haines and David Bonner, a bespoke shirt maker and entrepreneur respectively, established a joint venture retailing fine handmade men's shirts on London's Jermyn Street.

The business was acquired by Threadology London in 2021.

The latest Haines and Bonner designs of fabric from Italy, Portugal, Austria and Germany are used to produce a luxury range of shirts in two-fold and 1/50s pure cotton, in sizes ranging from 14.5" to 19.

Products
Men's shirts
Ties
Cufflinks

Online clothing retailers of the United Kingdom